Houssein Hassan Rizk (born 1 January 1997) is a Lebanese footballer who plays as a midfielder for  club Shabab Sahel.

Club career

Nabi Chit 
Rizk began his career with Nabi Chit during the 2017–18 Lebanese Premier League season; he scored three goals in 20 games, helping his side avoid relegation by finishing in 10th place.

Shabab Sahel 
On 6 July 2018, Rizk joined newly-promoted Lebanese Premier League side Shabab Sahel. In 2018–19 Rizk played 20 games, scoring once. He helped Shabab Sahel win their first Lebanese Elite Cup in 2019, beating Ansar in the final on penalty shoot-outs.

On 3 January 2021, Rizk sustained an ACL injury to his right knee, in a league match against Nejmeh. He renewed his contract for two further seasons on 10 May. Rizk sustained another ACL injury, to his left knee, in February 2022; he underwent surgery.

International career 
Rizk made his debut for the Lebanon national team on 15 October 2019, coming on as a substitute in a 3–0 away win against Sri Lanka in the 2022 FIFA World Cup qualifiers.

Career statistics

International

Honours
Shabab Sahel
 Lebanese Elite Cup: 2019

References

External links

 
 
 
 
 

1997 births
Living people
People from Tyre District
Lebanese footballers
Lebanon international footballers
Association football midfielders
Lebanese Premier League players
Al Nabi Chit SC players
Shabab Al Sahel FC players
Lebanon youth international footballers